Joseph Raaf House is a historic home located at Washington, Franklin County, Missouri. It was built about 1896, and is a -story, brick dwelling with a rear ell on a stone foundation. The rear ell was in place by 1916. It has a gable roof and segmental arched door and window openings.  It features a full width front porch.

It was listed on the National Register of Historic Places in 2000.

References

Houses on the National Register of Historic Places in Missouri
Houses completed in 1896
Buildings and structures in Franklin County, Missouri
National Register of Historic Places in Franklin County, Missouri